Oh Shit may refer to:

 Oh Shit!, a 1980s video game
 "Oh Shit", a 1978 song by Buzzcocks issued as the B-side to "What Do I Get?", later included as a bonus track for the 1996 re-release of Another Music in a Different Kitchen
 "Oh Shit", a 1989 song by KMFDM from Don't Blow Your Top (album)
 "Oh Shit", a 1992 song by the Pharcyde from Bizarre Ride II the Pharcyde
 "Oh Shit!!!", a 2016 song by Injury Reserve from Floss (mixtape)

See also
 Shit (disambiguation)
 Holy shit (disambiguation)
 "Aw Shit", a 2014 song by Wiz Khalifa from 28 Grams
 Oh Sit!, a 2010s American game show
 Oh Shoot, a 1921 novel by Rex Beach